Events from the year 1769 in Canada.

Incumbents
Monarch: George III

Governors
Governor of the Province of Quebec: Guy Carleton
Governor of Nova Scotia: Michael Francklin
Commodore-Governor of Newfoundland: John Byron
Governor of St. John's Island: Walter Patterson

Events
 The American colonies begin their westward expansion, settling Tennessee.
 Prince Edward Island becomes a separate colony from Nova Scotia.
 April 20 – Chief Pontiac of the Ottawa is killed by a Kaskaskia Indian in Illinois.

Births
 March 12: Sir Archibald Campbell, 1st Baronet, army officer and colonial administrator (d.1843) 
 August 16: Peter Fidler, fur trader, mapmaker, explorer (d.1822) 
 October 6: Isaac Brock, military commander, administrator of Upper Canada (d.1812)

Full date unknown
 Francis Gore, colonial administrator (d.1852)

Deaths

Historical documents
"Small-Pox rages here with great Violence" - 6-7 die in Montreal most days, but Canadians' approval of inoculation gives hope "Fatality will soon cease"

Attorney general suggests ways (rejected by Gov. Carleton) to mix British law with French laws that are "most necessary to [Canadians'] satisfaction"

Maseres dissents from governor's advice to revive French laws because British goal is "to assimilate [Quebec] in religion, laws, and government"

Board of Trade's recommendations to Privy Council committee for Quebec provincial assembly, justice system, ecclesiastical affairs, and revenue

Bread bakers must commit to baking year-round by laying in flour supply for when poor roads prevent grain delivery, and not halting when profits are low

Letter to John Wilkes from John Adams, James Otis, Samuel Adams and others ("Sons of Liberty") on Canada's place in assault on American rights

To be sold: "Likely Negro Fellow [who] understands Cooking, waiting at Table, and Houshold-work, &c. &c." and speaks English and French

Gabrielle Joncaire says not to buy land swindled from her by her husband, who also imprisoned her and caused her "to make off for New-England"

Call for proposals to supply and/or make repairs to Quebec City buildings, listing items of various types and materials, and standards of workmanship

Surgeon of 8th Regiment at Quebec City, having inoculated 630 people "with the usual Success," assures public recent smallpox death was "Natural"

Whooping cough "extremely fatal" to children in Montreal, who should be bled and given gentle purgative "sweetened with the Sugar of the Country"

To end priests' influence over "ignorant Natives," French clergy must be replaced with vigorous Protestants (Note: stereotypes of Indigenous people)

Troubling news "of an Intended Indian War" at Detroit and elsewhere, and "unwearied malicious Attempts" of French from Mississippi River

Chief Massigihash asks Detroit commander for compassion, requesting especially return to them of Ojibwes' "father," Lt. Sinclair; Capt. Turnbull replies

Major Robert Rogers acquitted of all charges, but his "improper and dangerous correspondence" and later notion to escape raised suspicions

Over 100 families gone "to settle themselves on Beaver Island, situated in the middle of Lake Ontario, abounding with the finest furrs of all Canada"

Navy commanders to watch for "great cargoes" of European goods smuggled in French fishing boats to Newfoundland, Nova Scotia and Cape Breton

Local Indigenous people, though few, cause Nova Scotia to fail, but can be defeated by nearby First Nations (Note: stereotypes of Indigenous people)

"----- Quine, and Flora a Negro Women [sic], were lately tried, convicted, and sentenced to receive 25 Lashes at the Public Whipping-Post, for stealing"

House of Assembly journal shows progress of bill "for preventing the Exportation of Wheat, Rye, Barley, Flour, Meal, or Pease" during grain shortage

Assembly tells Council that shortfall preventing payment of government debts can't be cleared by taxes that people can't pay, and so frugality must do

Notice that Earl of Egmont is about to settle his 100,000-acre township on Shubenacadie and Wilmot rivers, which is 15 miles from Halifax

Midwife Eleanor Fallon asks Assembly pay for services to poor women of Halifax, who without her "wou'd be distress'd in a very great degree" (denied)

Halifax man has house of "entertainment" with "Chop-House," baking facility for ladies' orders, stables and slaughterhouse, and large assembly room

Halifax notary public will draw up assignments, acquitances, certificates of bankrupts, bargains and sales, bonds, jointures, affidavits, warrants etc.

Front-page essay on frugality, "so necessary to the happiness of the world"

Incoming St. John's Island lieutenant governor receives paternal advice comprising impartiality, disinterest, moderation, generosity and good manners

Four ships of the line and other Royal Navy craft will "protect the Newfoundland fishery in its full extent" from French disregarding Treaty of Paris terms

New Newfoundland governor will be better than previous, who was of "disservice to the fishery" because of his attachment to initial "false opinion" of it

Newfoundland trader glad he forbid heating turpentine in his fireplace, as it took fire elsewhere, which would be "of Shocking Consequence" for him

Hudson's Bay Company criticized for failing to expand on its initial success by opening opportunity to others for investment and increase of its trade

Having failed in first expedition from Hudson Bay, Samuel Hearne blames "desertion," "embezzlement," and "villany" of Indigenous people with him

Churchill River people at Hudson Bay seem melancholy but good-natured, very honest, "remarkably clever in repartees" and "converse extremely well"

Intense January cold in cabin on Churchill River freezes bedding to bed frame and disturbs sleep hourly with loud cracking of house timbers

Notice of death of Edmond Hoyle, "well known in the polite world for writing[...]on the games of Whist, Quadrille, Piquet, Chess and Blackgammon"

"How long we may[...]carry on a friendly communication, will become a question, as the sword of civil war seems ready to start from the scabbard"

America not ripe for rebellion, as even Bostonians don't insult occupying troops, though all British forces "would be nothing" in Americans' hands

"Wise Men suffer, good men grieve; Knaves invent, and Fools believe; Help, O Lord! send Aid unto us, Or fools and Knaves will quite undo us."

References 

 
Canada
69